The 1962 Dunedin mayoral election was part of the New Zealand local elections held that same year. In 1962, elections were held for the Mayor of Dunedin plus other local government positions including twelve city councillors. The polling was conducted using the standard first-past-the-post electoral method.

Background
Stuart Sidey, the incumbent Mayor was re-elected for a second term. He narrowly defeated councillor Russell Calvert who was the Labour Party candidate. Initially Phil Connolly the MP for Dunedin Central (who had run in 1953) was to be Labour's mayoral candidate, but was forced to withdraw on grounds of ill-health. Connolly was sure he would have won had he stood, a feeling which was reinforced after the comparatively inexperienced Calvert came so close to winning against Sidey.

The Citizens' Association increased their council representation, winning ten seats on the city council to the Labour Party's two.

Results
The following table shows the results for the election:

Notes

References

Mayoral elections in Dunedin
Dunedin
Politics of Dunedin
1960s in Dunedin
October 1962 events in New Zealand